The sphenomandibularis is a muscle attaching to the sphenoid bone and the mandible.  It is a muscle of mastication. Unlike most of the muscles of the human body, which had been categorized several centuries ago, the sphenomandibularis was discovered in the mid-1990s at the University of Maryland at Baltimore. The findings were published in 1996. The sphenomandibularis is considered by many sources to be a portion of the temporalis, rather than a distinct muscle.

References

External links
Identification and Visualization of the Sphenomandibularis Muscle in the Visible Human Male and Female Data Sets; Visible Human Project|; National Library of Medicine
 Sphenomandibularis Muscle figure

Muscles of the head and neck